Travis Mahoney (born 24 July 1990) is an Australian medley and backstroke swimmer. Winner of two relay medals at the 2012 World Short Course Championships, he is also part of the quartet that broke the world record in the short course mixed 4 × 50 metres freestyle relay. In 2016, he qualified for his first Olympic Games.

Career
A late bloomer who struggled during his junior career, Mahoney first represented Australia at the 2012 World Cup winning three medals at the age of 22. In Beijing, he won silver in 400 metre individual medley and in Singapore, Mahoney won silver in the 400 metre individual medley and bronze in the 200 metre backstroke.

The following month at the 2012 World Short Course Championships in Istanbul, he won two medals in relay events. Alongside Tommaso D'Orsogna, Kyle Richardson and Kenneth To, they won the bronze in the 4 × 100 metre freestyle relay in 3:07.27. In the 4 × 200 metre freestyle relay event, Mahoney swam the third leg of the heats to qualify third fastest. In the final, Mahoney was replaced by Richardson and with D'Orsogna, Jarrod Killey and Robert Hurley won silver in a new Oceanian record time of 6:52.29. In his individual swims, Mahoney finished 7th in the 200 metre backstroke and narrowly missed the final in both the 400 and the 200 metre individual medley events 
finishing 9th and 10th respectively.

At the 2013 Australian Swimming Championships, Mahoney won silver in the 400 metre individual medley in 4:18.09, just missing the qualifying time for the 2013 World Championships by 1.61 seconds.

In December he swam in five legs of the 2013 World Cup. In Dubai, Mahoney won bronze in both the 200 metre backstroke and the 400 metre individual medley. In Singapore, the foursome of Mahoney, Regan Leong, Brittany Elmslie and Emma McKeon won silver in the mixed 4 × 50 metre freestyle relay. At the penultimate leg in Tokyo in the heats of the mixed 4 × 50 metre freestyle relay D'Orsogna, Leong, the Campbell sisters Bronte and Cate set a new world record time of 1:31.13. In the final, Mahoney replaced Leong as the second leg swimmer and together they won gold and set another world record, dropping to the time to 1:29.61. The final leg in Beijing saw the same foursome win gold in the event again but narrowly missing the world record posting a time of 1:30.52. Mahoney also picked another individual medal with bronze in the 400 metre individual medley to cap off his world cup campaign.

At the 2014 Australian Swimming Championships, he again won silver in the 400 metre individual medley in a personal best time of 4:17.39, bettering the B standard time and qualified for the Commonwealth Games. At the Glasgow Commonwealth Games in July, Mahoney swam under 4:15 for the first time in the 400 IM to finish as the second fastest qualifier. In the final, he finished 6th with a time of 4:18.51.

Three weeks later at the 2014 Pan Pacific Swimming Championships in Gold Coast, Australia, Mahoney finished 6th in the 200 metre individual medley, 7th in the 400 metre individual medley, 14th in the 200 metre backstroke and 17th in the 200 metre freestyle.

In December, he represented Australia at his second World Short Course Championships in Doha. On night 1, Mahoney, Matthew Abood, Cameron McEvoy and Tommaso D'Orsogna finished 5th in the 4 × 100 metre freestyle relay. The following morning he placed a disappointing 21st in the 400 metre individual medley in a time of 4:12.21. Illness stuck Mahoney and as a result withdrew from his remaining events – the 100 and 200 metre individual medley and the 200 metre backstroke.

In April 2015, at the national titles, Mahoney finished third in the 400 IM to again narrowly miss out on qualifying for the World Championships. In July, he competed at the Summer Universiade in Gwangju, South Korea. On night 1, Mahoney, Jacob Hansford, Jack McLoughlin and Justin James were fifth to touch the wall in the 4 × 100 metre freestyle relay only to be later disqualified when James as the anchor swimmer broke early. Redemption was made by the same foursome in 4 × 200 metre freestyle relay by taking out the silver medal. In the 4 × 100 metre medley relay, the Australian quartet of Mahoney, Nicholas Schafer, Nicholas Brown and Justin James finished fourth with Mahoney swimming the backstroke leg in 54.84. Individually, Mahoney swam 5th in the 200 IM, 6th in the 400 IM and 13th in 100 metre freestyle.

In October, Mahoney competed at his third World Cup. Only attending the Tokyo leg, he finished 5th both the 200 and 400 IM events, 13th in the 200 metre freestyle and 14th in the 100 freestyle.

In April 2016, at the national championships he finished second in the 400 metres individual medley in a personal best time of 4:14.98 to qualify for his first Olympic Games. An emotional Mahoney stated that his greatest inspiration was his aunt Sally McLean who died in August 2015 after a nine-year battle with cancer at the age of 52. He also lost his grandmother within two months of losing his aunt.

See also
 List of World Swimming Championships (25 m) medalists (men)

References

External links 
 
 
 
 
 
 
 

1990 births
Australian male freestyle swimmers
Commonwealth Games competitors for Australia
World record setters in swimming
Living people
Australian male backstroke swimmers
Australian male medley swimmers
Swimmers from Melbourne
Swimmers at the 2014 Commonwealth Games
Swimmers at the 2016 Summer Olympics
Olympic swimmers of Australia
Universiade medalists in swimming
Universiade silver medalists for Australia
Medalists at the 2015 Summer Universiade
21st-century Australian people
People from Box Hill, Victoria
Sportsmen from Victoria (Australia)